Bernardino Plastina, O.M. (1645–1697) was a Roman Catholic prelate who served as Bishop of Oppido Mamertina (1694–1697).

Biography
Bernardino Plastina was born on 10 Nov 1645 in Fuscaldo, Italy and ordained a priest on 17 Dec 1667 in the Order of the Minims.
On 25 Jan 1694, he was appointed during the papacy of Pope Innocent XII as Bishop of Oppido Mamertina.
On 31 Jan 1694, he was consecrated bishop by Pier Matteo Petrucci, Cardinal-Priest of San Marcello al Corso, with Giovanni Battista Visconti Aicardi, Bishop of Novara, and Gennaro Crespino, Bishop of Minori, serving as co-consecrators. 
He served as Bishop of Oppido Mamertina until his death on 16 Feb 1697.

References

External links and additional sources
 (for Chronology of Bishops) 
 (for Chronology of Bishops) 

17th-century Italian Roman Catholic bishops
Bishops appointed by Pope Innocent XII
1645 births
1697 deaths